Gracias Por Estar Aquí (Eng.: "Thank You For Being Here") is the tenth studio album by Mexican singer-songwriter Marco Antonio Solís. It was released by Universal Music Latino on October 22, 2013 (see 2013 in music).

Gracias Por Estar Aquí reached number one on the Billboard Top Latin Albums chart in the United States. Two singles were released from the album: "Tres Semanas" and "De Mil Amores". The album earned a Grammy nomination for Best Latin Pop Album at the 57th Annual Grammy Awards, a Latin Grammy nomination for Best Traditional Pop Vocal Album, and a Premio Lo Nuestro nomination for Pop Album of the Year at Premio Lo Nuestro 2015.

"Tres Semanas" was nominated for Pop Song of the Year at Premio Lo Nuestro 2015, while "De Mil Amores" was awarded a Latin Grammy Award for Best Regional Mexican Song. In Mexico, the album achieved Gold status.

Background and release
The first single, "Tres Semanas" was released on July 15, 2013. The song became a number-one hit on the Mexican Monitor Latino chart. The official video for "Tres Semanas" premiered July 26, 2013. The album was made available for preorder on September 26, 2013. The official video for the second single "De Mil Amores" premiered on February 28, 2014.

Reception
On August 3, 2014,  became a number-one hit on the Mexican Monitor Latino chart for four consecutive weeks. The album was nominated for Best Traditional Pop Vocal Album and "De Mil Amores" won a Latin Grammy Award for Best Regional Mexican Song at the Latin Grammy Awards of 2014. It was nominated for Best Latin Pop Album at the 57th Annual Grammy Awards. It was also nominated for Pop Album of the Year and "Tres Semanas" was nominated for Pop Song of the Year at Premio Lo Nuestro 2015.

Track listing
All songs written and composed by Marco Antonio Solís

Deluxe Edition was released on April 29, 2014

All songs written and composed by Marco Antonio Solís except "El Perdedor" by Enrique Iglesias and Descemer Bueno, and "Historia de un Amor" by Carlos Eleta Almarán

Charts

Weekly charts

Year-end charts

Certifications

Personnel
The following credits are from AllMusic

See also
List of number-one Billboard Latin Albums from the 2010s
List of number-one Billboard Latin Pop Albums from the 2010s

References

External links
 
 
 
 
  September 26, 2013
  

 

2013 albums
Marco Antonio Solís albums
Universal Music Latino albums
Spanish-language albums